Swing, Swang, Swung is the fourth studio album of Christian rock band Guardian. It was released in 1994 by Pakaderm Records.

The album takes the band into experimental grounds in folk and acoustic music. However, it was harshly criticized by fans for leaving behind their rock and metal roots.

Track listing
All songs written by Tony Palacios except where noted.
 "The Way Home Back" – 4:32
 "Endless Summer" (Bach) – 4:30
 "C'mon Everyone" – 4:58
 "Like the Sun" (Bach) – 5:18
 "Rich Man Over the Line" – 4:04
 "Your Love" (Rowe) – 4:46
 "Don't Say That It's Over" (Bach) – 4:47
 "See You in Heaven" – 4:38
 "Let the Whole World" – 5:02
 "Preacher and the Bear" (Traditional, arranged by Guardian) – 3:14
 "Still on My Mind" – 3:48
 "Why Don't We" (Ney) – 1:29

Personnel 
adapted from liner notes:

Guardian
 Jamie Rowe – lead vocals
 Tony Palacios – guitars, vocals
 David Bach – bass, vocals, rhythm guitar (7)
 Karl Ney – drums

Additional musicians
 John Elefante – Mellotron, assorted digital claviers, drums
 Michael W. Smith – acoustic piano
 J.R. McNeely – Nashville guitar, bass 
 Jon Knox – drums (1, 3-6)
 Matt Davich – clarinet
 Bill Huber – trombone
 David Balph – trumpet
 The Nashville String Machine – strings
 Tom Howard – sting arrangements and director

Production 
 John Elefante – producer
 Dino Elefante – producer
 Mark Maxwell – A&R
 J.R. McNeely – engineer, mixing 
 Ken Love – mastering
 Diana Barnes – art direction, design
 David Bach – design 
 Michael Wilson – photography
 Marc Whitmore – management 

Studios
 The Snack Bar (Brentwood, Tennessee) – recording location 
 Sound Kitchen (Franklin, Tennessee) – mixing location
 MasterMix (Nashville, Tennessee) – mastering location

References

External links
Album review in Christian Music Online

Guardian (band) albums
1994 albums